We Ain't Fessin' (Double Quotes) is an EP by Deep Puddle Dynamics and Anticon. It was released on Anticon on February 25, 2002.

The EP includes Deep Puddle Dynamics' "More from June" and Anticon's "We Ain't Fessin' (Double Quotes)". The CD version of the EP also includes another song by Anticon, titled "Pitty Party People".

Critical reception
David M. Pecoraro of Pitchfork gave the EP an 8.2 out of 10, saying: "From a baseball stadium, to a political rally, to a game show, these eighteen minutes wander through more audio environments than most full-lengths." Sam Hunt of Dusted Magazine called it "[Anticon's] finest achievement".

Track listing

Personnel
Credits adapted from liner notes.

 Sole – vocals (1, 2, 3)
 Doseone – vocals (1, 2, 3)
 Alias – vocals (1, 2, 3), production (2)
 Slug – vocals (1)
 Eyedea – vocals (1)
 John Herndon – production (1)
 DJ Mayonnaise – turntables (1), production (2)
 Passage – vocals (2)
 Why? – vocals (2)
 Pedestrian – vocals (2, 3)
 Jel – production (2, 3)
 Odd Nosdam – production (2)
 Sixtoo – production (3)
 Dax Pierson – keyboards (3)

References

External links
 
 

2002 EPs
Anticon EPs
Alternative hip hop EPs